Bijawar Assembly constituency is one of the 230 Vidhan Sabha (Legislative Assembly) constituencies of Madhya Pradesh state in central India. This constituency came into existence in 1951, as one of the 48 Vidhan Sabha constituencies of the erstwhile Vindhya Pradesh state.

Overview
Bijawar (constituency number 52) is one of the 6 Vidhan Sabha constituencies located in Chhatarpur district. This constituency covers the Satai and Bijawar nagar panchayats and parts of Chhatarpur, Bijawar and Rajnagar tehsils of the district.

Bijawar is part of Tikamgarh Lok Sabha constituency along with seven other Vidhan Sabha segments, namely, Maharajpur and Chhatarpur in this district and Jatara, Prithvipur, Niwari, Tikamgarh and Khargapur in Tikamgarh district.

Members of Legislative Assembly
As from a constituency of Vindhya Pradesh:
 1951: Diwan Pratap Singh, Indian National Congress / Piyare Lal, Indian National Congress 
As from a constituency of Madhya Pradesh:
 1957: Gayatri Devi and Hansraj, both from the Indian National Congress
 1962: Govind Singh Ju Deo, Independent
 1967: K. Nath, Indian National Congress
 1972: Yadvendra Singh, Bharatiya Jana Sangh
 1977: Mukund Sakharam, Janata Party
 1980: Yadvendra Singh, Indian National Congress (I)
 1985: Jujhar Singh Bundela, Bharatiya Janata Party
 1990: Jujhar Singh Bundela, Bharatiya Janata Party
 1993: Manvendra Singh, Indian National Congress
 1998: Manvendra Singh, Indian National Congress
 2003: Jitendra Singh Bundela, Bharatiya Janata Party
 2008: Asharani, Bharatiya Janata Party
 2013 Pushpendranath Pathak "Guddan Bhaiya" Bhartiya Janta Party

See also
 Bijawar
 Satai

References

Chhatarpur district
Assembly constituencies of Madhya Pradesh